DJ Sharkey (born Jonathan Kneath on 25 July 1974 in Plymouth, England) is a British record producer, disc jockey and rapper. As of September 2011 he is semi-retired from music production and performance. Sharkey has performed in the United Kingdom, the United States, Australia, Canada, and Japan.

Career 
Sharkey initially became known as an MC at "hardcore rave" events in Britain in 1993. In 1995, he moved into music production, teaming up with DJ Hixxy to release the track "Toytown", which proved one of the most significant signature tunes of the UK's happy hardcore style in the 1990s. This led both Sharkey and Hixxy to being signed by the UK-based dance music label React Music, and the pair released Bonkers, the first in a series of albums which has become the best-selling hardcore compilation series of all time. "Revolutions", a release on React, reached 53 in the UK charts, and Sharkey consequently released the album Hard Life in 1998.

Sharkey also produced mixes for Bonkers 2, 3, 4, 5, 8, 9, 10, 11, 12, 13, 14, 15, 16, and 17. Volumes 4 and 5 achieved silver sales status in the UK with Bonkers 3 reaching gold status. In 2001, Sharkey made his first appearance on the Eurodance compilation Dancemania series, at Speed 6, along with Hixxy. He was also invited to mix on BBC Radio 1 in 2003, performing John Peel's Essential Mix.

Retirement
In January 2011, Sharkey announced his retirement from Hardcore and Freeform. He completed a final tour, playing in various countries around the world, and then reportedly retired in September 2011. In 2021 Sharkey started his own show, Bonkers Beat, on the online radio station Beat 106 Scotland on Friday nights.

References

External links
 Releases
 
 Sharkey on Last FM

English DJs
English record producers
Happy hardcore musicians
1975 births
Living people
UK hardcore musicians
Musicians from Plymouth, Devon